Santissimo Nome di Maria may refer to two different churches in Rome:
 Santissimo Nome di Maria al Foro Traiano Church
 Santissimo Nome di Maria in Via Latina

See also:
 Santissimo Nome di Gesù e Maria in Via Lata, a church in Rome